Sergei Frolov may refer to:
 Sergei Frolov (footballer)
 Sergei Frolov (artist)
 Sergei Frolov (actor)